Sunit Ghosh (1 September 1934 – 7 November 2021) was an Indian cricket umpire. He stood in two Test matches in 1988 and seven ODI games between 1987 and 1989.

See also
 List of Test cricket umpires
 List of One Day International cricket umpires

References

1934 births
2021 deaths
Place of birth missing
Indian Test cricket umpires
Indian One Day International cricket umpires